2012 Italian Athletics Indoor Championships was the 43rd edition of the Italian Athletics Indoor Championships and were held in Ancona.

Results

Men

Women

References

External links
 All results at FIDAL web site

Italian Athletics Championships
Athletics
Italian Athletics Indoor Championships
Athletics competitions in Italy